The Minister of National Security and Intelligence is a minister in the government of New Zealand who is responsible for leading and setting the policies and legislative framework of New Zealand's national security system. The current minister is Chris Hipkins, who is also the current Prime Minister of New Zealand as by convention, the National Security and Intelligence portfolio is always held by the Prime Minister.

Role and Responsibly
The Minister of National Security and Intelligence is responsible for overseeing policy and legislation relating to New Zealand's national security apparatus. The Minister also chairs the Cabinet National Security Committee and the Parliamentary specialist committee on Intelligence and Security. The minister does not provide direct oversight to New Zealand's main two intelligence agencies, the New Zealand Security Intelligence Service (NZSIS) and Government Communications Security Bureau (GCSB), which is instead provided by two separate portfolios, Minister Responsible for the NZSIS and Minister Responsible for the GCSB. Administrative support for the portfolio is provided by the Department of the Prime Minister and Cabinet

Prior to the creation of the National Security and Intelligence portfolio in 2014, the NZSIS and GCSB portfolios were, by convention and without exception, held by the Prime Minister, meaning sole ministerial oversight of New Zealand's intelligence and security agencies and arrangements lay with the Prime Minister. The portfolio was established following the 2014 election by Prime Minister John Key as part of a rearrangement to the way New Zealand's intelligence sector was governed. Since then it has been convention for the Prime Minister to hold the National Security and Intelligence portfolio, while direct ministerial oversight for the NZSIS and GCSB is delegated to another senior minister. Chris Hipkins has held the portfolio since becoming Prime Minister in January 2023, while Andrew Little currently holds the NZSIS and GCSB portfolios.

List of Ministers of National Security and Intelligence
Key

Notes

References

National Security